The Xian H-6I bomber was a Chinese military aircraft and a possible successor to the aging twin-engined H-6 jet bomber. Program first begun in 1970 and a prototype made the first flight in January 1978, but the project was canceled in 1980 before the bomber went into production.

Development
Originally proposed by Xi'an Aircraft Factory in June 1970 as a 4-engined version of Xian H-6, design begun in February 1971 after the proposal was granted by the state. In 1973, People's Liberation Army Air Force (PLAAF) issued additional requirement of incorporating capability against sea targets, and formally joint the project. By the end of 1977, the first sample was completed and the maiden flight was followed in January 1978 with state certification received in the following year.

Design
The prototype was powered by 4 Rolls-Royce Spey Mk 512 engines, originally purchased as spare engines for Hawker Siddeley Trident bought previously by China. In comparison to the original H-6, the fuselage was lengthened and the engines were rearranged to be carried in individual pods under the wings. Ferry range is increased to 8,100 km (with standard payload), and combat radius is increased to over 5,000 km (with nuclear payload).

The aircraft was able to climb 40% faster than H-6, and the range is also increased by a third to 8,000 km. More weapons could be carried, including bombs of various sizes, sizing from 100 kg to the massive 9-ton ones. The bomb bay was sized at 8.6 meter x 1.8 meter x 2.72 meter, capable of holding a maximum of 18 tons of ordnance, i.e. 2 of the 9-ton bombs, though to achieve maximum range, the payload had to be greatly reduced to 7 tons. Nuclear bombs could also be carried, as well as anti-ship and land attack missiles, and in the latter configuration, a total 3 missiles are carried, one under each wing, and a third semi-buried in the bomb bay. The permanent armament of the aircraft was a tail gun mount incorporating a twin 23 mm gun.

The crew totaled 6, seated in two separate pressurized compartments. Pilot/mission commander, co-pilot/flight engineer, navigator/observer, and bombardier/flight mechanic were seated in the forward pressurized compartment, while the electronics warfare/communication officer and tail gunner/assistant communication officer seated in the pressurized compartment in the rear. The avionics of the aircraft borrowed heavily from the reverse engineering of similar American systems obtained from captured or shot-down American aircraft provided by North Vietnam during/after the Vietnam War.

See also

References

1970s Chinese bomber aircraft
Cancelled military aircraft projects of China
H-08
Quadjets
High-wing aircraft